The 2022 Stanford Cardinal football team represented Stanford University as a member of the Pac-12 Conference during the 2022 NCAA Division I FBS football season. The team played home games at Stanford Stadium in Stanford, California. The Cardinal were led by 12th-year head coach David Shaw in his final season. He resigned effective immediately, on November 27, 2022, just over an hour after the last game of the season after the Cardinal's second consecutive 3–9 season.

E. J. Smith, son of all-time leading rusher in National Football League (NFL) history, Emmitt Smith, was the team's top running back.

Schedule

Roster

Game summaries

Colgate

No. 10 USC

at No. 18 Washington

at No. 13 Oregon

Oregon State

at Notre Dame

Arizona State

at No. 12 UCLA

Washington State

at No. 13 Utah

at California

BYU

Sources:

References

Stanford
Stanford Cardinal football seasons
Stanford Football